Callisema is a genus of longhorn beetles of the subfamily Lamiinae.

 Callisema consortium Martins & Galileo, 1990
 Callisema elongata Galileo & Martins, 1992
 Callisema iucaua Martins & Galileo, 1996
 Callisema rufipes Martins & Galileo, 1990
 Callisema socium Martins & Galileo, 1990

References

Calliini
Cerambycidae genera